Benito is the Spanish form of Benedict and is both a masculine given name and a surname. Notable people with the name include:

People with the given name "Benito" include

A
Benito Manuel Agüero (1624–1668), Spanish painter
Benito Alazraki (1921–2007), Mexican film director
Benito Andion, Salvadorian diplomat
Benito Antonio Martínez Ocasio (born 1994), Puerto Rican singer
Benito Archundia (born 1966), Mexican football referee
Benito Armiñán, Spanish soldier

B
Benito Báez (born 1977), Dominican baseball player
Benito Baranda (born 1959), Chilean psychologist
Benito Bello de Torices (1660–1714), Spanish composer
Benito Boldi (1934–2021), Italian footballer
Benito Pérez Brito (1747–1813), Spanish military officer
Benito Buachidze (1905–1937), Georgian literary critic

C
Benito Cabanban (1911–1990), Filipino bishop
Benito Cabrera (born 1963), Spanish composer
Benito Calderón (1902–??), Cuban baseball player
Benito Canónico (1894–1971), Venezuelan composer
Benito Carbone (born 1971), Italian footballer
Benito Carvajales (1913–??), Cuban footballer
Benito Castro (born 1946), Mexican musician
Benito Cereno (writer), American comic book writer
Benito Cocchi (1934–2016), Italian bishop
Benito Contreras (1905–1972), Mexican footballer
Benito Corghi (1938–1976), Italian truck driver
Benito Rebolledo Correa (1880–1964), Chilean painter

D
Benito de Jesús (1912–2010), Puerto Rican songwriter
Benito T. de Leon (born 1960), Filipino military officer
Benito R. de Monfort (1800–1871), Spanish photographer
Benito de Rivas (??–1668), Puerto Rican prelate
Benito de San Juan (1727–1809), Spanish military officer
Benito Fernández de Santa Ana (1707–1761), Spanish friar
Benito de Soto (1805–1835), Spanish pirate
Benito Díaz (1898–1990), Spanish footballer
Benito di Paula (born 1941), Brazilian singer-songwriter

E
Benito Elizalde (born 1961), Spanish rower
Benito Espinós (1748–1818), Spanish painter

F
Benito Floro (born 1952), Spanish football manager
Benito Gennaro Franceschetti (1935–2005), Italian archbishop

G
Benito Pérez Galdós (1843–1920), Spanish novelist
Benito Garozzo (born 1927), Italian bridge player
Benito Caballero Garza (born 1965), Mexican politician
Benito Guerra Jr. (born 1985), Mexican rally driver
Benito Gutmacher (born 1950), Argentinian actor

H
Benito Huerta (born 1952), American artist

J
Benito Jacovitti (1923–1997), Italian comic artist
Benito Serrano Jiménez (1850–1945), Costa Rican politician
Benito Joanet (1935–2020), Spanish footballer and manager
Benito Jones (born 1997), American football player
Benito Juárez (1806–1872), Mexican politician

K
Benito Kemble (born 1968), Dutch footballer

L
Benito Legarda (1853–1915), Filipino legislator
Benito J. Legarda (1926–2020), Filipino historian
Benito Lertxundi (born 1942), Spanish singer-songwriter
Benito Lopez (born 1994), American mixed martial artist
Benito Lorenzi (1925–2007), Italian football player
Benito Lynch (1885–1951), Argentine novelist

M
Benito Madueño y Ramos (1654–1739), Spanish prelate
Benito Quinquela Martín (1890–1977), Argentine painter
Benito Martinez (disambiguation), multiple people
Benito Masilevu (born 1989), Fijian rugby union footballer
Benito Medero (1922–2007), Uruguayan politician
Benito Messeguer (1930–1982), Spanish-Mexican artist
Benito Montalvo (born 1985), Argentine football coach
Benito Arias Montano (1527–1598), Spanish orientalist
Benito Chávez Montenegro (born 1947), Mexican politician
Benito Jerónimo Feijoo e Montenegro (1676–1764), Galician monk
Benito Morales (1803–1889), Nicaraguan politician
Benito Mussolini (1883–1945), Italian dictator

N
Benito Nardone (1906–1964), Uruguayan journalist
Benito Natividad (1875–1964), Filipino military officer

O
Benito Orgiana (1938–2021), Italian politician
Benito Owusu Bio (born 1968), Ghanaian politician

P
Benito Pabón y Suárez de Urbina (1895–1958), Spanish lawyer and trade unionist
Benito Pastoriza Iyodo (born 1954), Puerto Rican author
Benito Vicetto Pérez (1824–1878), Galician writer
Benito Perojo (1894–1974), Spanish film director
Benito Pocino (born 1958), Spanish actor
Benito Prats (born 1980), Cuban American psychic, realtor, Award winning exotic dancer.

R
Benito Raman (born 1994), Belgian footballer
Benito Ramírez (born 1995), Spanish footballer
Benito Ramos (1918–??), Mexican fencer
Benito F. Reyes (1914–1992), Filipino academic administrator
Benito Rigoni (1936–2021), Italian bobsledder
Benito Romano (born 1950), Puerto Rican-American politician
Benito Ros (born 1981), Spanish mountain cyclist
Benito Rosales, Nicaraguan politician

S
Benito Salas (disambiguation), multiple people
Benito Santiago (born 1965), Puerto Rican baseball player
Benito Santiago Jr. (born 1989), Puerto Rican basketball player
Benito Sanz y Forés (1828–1895), Spanish cardinal
Benito Sarti (1936–2020), Italian footballer
Benito Skinner (born 1993), American comedian
Benito Stefanelli (1929–1999), Italian film actor and stuntman
Benito Sylvain (1868–1915), Haitian journalist

T
Benito Tiamzon (born 1951), Filipino political organizer
Benito Totti (1914–1940), Italian boxer

U
Benito Urteaga (1941–1976), Argentine revolutionary

V
Benito Rodríguez Valtodano (??–1629), Nicaraguan bishop
Benito van de Pas (born 1993), Dutch darts player
Benito Salas Vargas (1770–1816), Colombian military officer
Benito Vázquez (1738–1810), Spanish soldier and explorer
Benito Vergara (1934–2015), Filipino plant scientist
Benito Villegas (1877–1952), Argentine chess master
Benito Vines (1837–1893), Cuban cleric

Z
Benito Zambrano (born 1965), Spanish screenwriter

Fictional characters
Benito Alessi, character from the Australian soap opera Neighbours

People with the surname 
Alberto Benito (disambiguation), multiple people
Álvaro Benito (born 1976), Spanish footballer
Amado Benito Jr. (born 1992), Filipino fighter
Asier Benito (born 1995), Spanish footballer
Azucena Sanchez Benito (born 1978), Spanish cyclist
Carl Benito (born 1954), Canadian politician
Cesar Benito, Spanish composer
Diego Benito (born 1988), Spanish footballer
Don Benito (pirate), Spanish pirate
Eduardo Benito (1891–1981), Spanish illustrator and painter
Elizabeth Odio Benito (born 1939), Costa Rican judge
Gabriel R. G. Benito (born 1960), Norwegian economist
Goyo Benito (1946–2020), Spanish footballer
Iker Benito (born 2002), Spanish footballer
Jordi Benito (1951–2008), Spanish artist
Loris Benito (born 1992), Swiss footballer
Marie Benito (born 1965), Guaman long-distance runner
Miguel Ángel Benito (born 1993), Spanish cyclist
Mireia Benito (born 1996), Spanish cyclist
Pedro Benito (born 2000), Spanish footballer
Sergio Benito (born 1999), Spanish footballer
Teófilo Benito (1966–2004), Spanish middle-distance runner

References 

Spanish-language surnames
Italian masculine given names
Spanish masculine given names
Surnames from given names